Darb-e Astaneh (also Romanized as Darb-e Āstāneh, Darb Āstāneh, and Dar Āstāneh) is a village in Heshmatabad Rural District, in the Central District of Dorud County, Lorestan Province, Iran. At the 2006 census, its population was 242, in 50 families.

References 

Towns and villages in Dorud County